Engø is a peninsula in Sandefjord, Norway. The original name was Engøy, which is a combination of the words eng (“meadow”) and øy (“island”). Former written forms include Ænghøy (in 1398), Enngøenn (1575), Engøen (1644), and later on Engø. Engø is also a place on Tjøme Island. Engøy is located next to Lahelle, northeast of the city.

A ferry operator, known as Jutøya AS, operates a small ferry which connects Sandefjord to Veierland Island. The ferry, known as MF Jutøya, is operated on contract with Vestviken Kollektivtrafikk. Engø lies 5-6 kilometers from the city center in Sandefjord, and the ferry ride to Veierland Island takes approximately 10 minutes. Veierland Island measures 4.4 km2 and is a car-free island which experiences significant summer tourism.

References

Peninsulas of Vestfold og Telemark
Sandefjord